Prosetín is a municipality and village in Žďár nad Sázavou District in the Vysočina Region of the Czech Republic. It has about 400 inhabitants.

Administrative parts
Villages of Brťoví and Čtyři Dvory are administrative parts of Prosetín.

References

Villages in Žďár nad Sázavou District